The Boldești-Scăeni oil field is an oil field located in Boldești-Scăeni, Prahova County. It was discovered in 1942 and developed by Petrom. It began production in 1945 and produces oil and natural gas.

References

Oil fields in Romania